Zambia national rugby union team 

The Zambia Rugby National team is a third-tier rugby union side representing Zambia. 

Official Name: ZAMBIA RUGBY UNION 
President:General Clement Sinkamba 

General Secretary: Musunka Silungwe  

The first national Zambian side was put together in 1965 under Presidency of Dr K K Kaunda who was their first Patron. Jackie Kyle the Irish International was the President of the Union. Their first game was against a Combined Services side from the UK and Zambia won the game 56-9 in Kitwe. An invitational side toured Ireland in 1965 played 9 and won 7 - points for 115 against 92. Zambia captained by G Brooklyn played against the touring side Penguin's, formed with many outstanding players in the UK. Zambia lost all 3 games. They played the Penguin's again in 1972. They now compete on an annual basis in the Africa Cup. Rugby union in Zambia is administered by the Zambian Rugby Union. It was founded by Ian Kirkpatrick, formerly of the All Blacks, in the 1960's. Prior to 1964 Rugby was administered under the combined Rhodesian Rugby Union which included present day Zimbabwe and was affiliated to the South African Rugby Union with Rhodesia having the equivalent status of a provincial team in the South African provincial competitions. 

Zambia competes in the Africa Rugby Cup. Zambia also competes in qualifying for the Rugby World Cup, although they have yet to qualify for the tournament.

World Cup Record
Zambia were not invited to the original world cup in 1987 in New Zealand. They did not enter the first two tournaments that were open to qualification in 1991 and 1995. They first attempted to qualify for the 1999 Rugby World Cup. Between then and RWC 2011 qualification attempts have been very unsuccessful, with elimination coming in the 1st Round every time. The most successful attempt was for the RWC 2007 where they got through their group as winners only to be beaten by Senegal in a playoff for a place in Round 2.

Overall Results

Year-by-Year Record
 1987: Not invited
 1991: Did not enter
 1995: Did not enter
 1999: Did not qualify - Eliminated in 1st Round

 2003: Did not qualify - Eliminated in 1st Round (Group A)

 2007: Did not qualify - Eliminated in Round 1a Playoff

Round 1a: Southern Pool

Round 1a: Playoff

 2011 - Did not qualify - Eliminated in 1st Round (Group B)

 2015 - Did not qualify - Eliminated in 1st Round (2012 CAR Africa Cup Division 1B)

See also
 Rugby union in Zambia

References

African national rugby union teams
Rugby union in Zambia
Rugby union